Stubica is a village in the municipality of Popovac, Serbia. According to the 2011 census, the village has a population of 1984 people.

References

Populated places in Pomoravlje District